Victoria Park is an inner south eastern suburb of Perth, Western Australia. Its local government area is the Town of Victoria Park.

Victoria Park is the eastern gateway to Perth's central business district (CBD), being the intersection of the three original eastern arterial roads: Albany Highway, Canning Highway, Great Eastern Highway, and the Causeway bridge.

History
The suburb of Victoria Park derives its name from "Victoria Park Estate", a development that took place there in the 1890s. It is believed the name was given to the estate because Queen Victoria was still on the throne, although it may be connected with  Victoria Park in Melbourne.

Progress and development was initially very slow, but a few houses were built around coach stops on the Albany Road, initially constructed from hand-sawn wooden logs. The road was rebuilt in the early 1860s by convicts. At this time the entire area from Canning Bridge to Belmont was simply known as "Canning".

In 1886, a settlement started at "2 Mile Spring", opposite the present location of the Broken Hill Hotel, and a year later, subdivision commenced. The building of the railway to Pinjarra in 1893 had a huge effect on the area - within a few years, a state school was built on Cargill Street and by 1898, the population had reached 1,197.

The following year, Broken Hill Hotel and the Town Hall were constructed, serving as both a community centre and as the council office for the Municipality of Victoria Park (until amalgamation with the City of Perth in 1917). The Town Hall was later demolished, while the Broken Hill Hotel is listed by the National Trust.

A tram service commenced in 1905, and by 1917 the population had reached 5,000, and had at their disposal electric lighting, a public library (1903), police station (1906), Victoria Park Post Office (1912), bowling club (1913) and two hotels, as well as several banks and numerous commercial enterprises and factories. After World War I, Albany Highway was bitumenised, and the commercial centre on either side of the road grew to rival centres in more established areas.

While by 1937 considered a "working man's district", by the mid-1970s the area had a higher-than-average elderly population according to ABS statistics, and the development of townhouses in place of some of the original dwellings saw increasing gentrification as city workers settled in areas closer to the Perth central business district.

The Causeway

The Causeway bridge was the first major bridge engineering project in or about Perth, and involved augmenting the Heirisson mudflats into a proper island. The mudflats were at that time an important resource for the Noongar people. 

The current bridge is the third in that location. It was originally opened in 1843, then largely rebuilt after disastrous floods in 1862, and reopened in 1867. It was improved several times in 1899, 1903, 1933 and 1943, then completely rebuilt from 1947 and reopened in 1952.

Geography
The suburb is mostly residential, although Albany Highway is a commercial "high street" and a number of parks can be found - most notably McCallum Park on the river, Raphael Park and the smaller Read Park and Hawthorne Park.

Demographics
At the 2001 Australian census, Victoria Park had a population of 6,980 people living in 3,998 dwellings. Over a quarter of Victoria Park's residents live in unit or apartment blocks. The ABS identified property and business services and retail as the primary occupations, followed by health, manufacturing, hospitality and education. 15.2% of those surveyed were from East or South-East Asia, while sizable Italian and South Asian minorities were reported.

Transport
Victoria Park is a major transit route, being the intersection point of Canning Highway to South Perth, Applecross and Fremantle; Great Eastern Highway to Belmont and Perth Airport; Albany Highway to Cannington and Armadale; and the Causeway to Perth's CBD. Albany Highway runs through the suburb as a main shopping street.

Victoria Park is home to Victoria Park railway station and is served by both the Armadale and Thornlie lines. The Station is located about 6km from the CBD. The current Victoria Park Station was rebuilt in 2008 and the old station has since been demolished. During the Shutdown in 2023 as part of Metronet works along the line, Victoria Park railway station will most likely be the terminus of the line for up to 18 months. The recent construction of new turnback siding makes this possible and that trains won't have to run bidirectional during the shutdown. The station is served by bus route 907 which acts as a Rail replacement bus service.

Politics
Victoria Park's only booth, Homestead Seniors Centre, is marginal at federal level, and supports the Australian Labor Party at state elections. Nearby booths in East Victoria Park consistently support the Australian Labor Party at both levels of government.

Notable people
 Pat Hawkins - world-record breaking cyclist

References

Suburbs of Perth, Western Australia
Suburbs in the Town of Victoria Park